Sepiapterin reductase (L-threo-7,8-dihydrobiopterin forming) is an enzyme with systematic name L-threo-7,8-dihydrobiopterin:NADP+ oxidoreductase. This enzyme catalyses the following chemical reaction

 (1) L-threo-7,8-dihydrobiopterin + NADP+  sepiapterin + NADPH + H+
 (2) L-threo-tetrahydrobiopterin + 2 NADP+  6-pyruvoyl-5,6,7,8-tetrahydropterin + 2 NADPH + 2 H+

This bacterial (Chlorobium tepidum) enzyme catalyses the final step in the de novo synthesis of tetrahydrobiopterin from GTP.

References

External links 
 

EC 1.1.1